Conference of Trees is a studio album by German musician and producer Pantha du Prince. It was released on 6 March 2020 under Modern Records.

The first single "Pius in Tacet" was released on 8 February 2020.

Critical reception
Conference of Trees was met with generally favorable reviews from critics. At Metacritic, which assigns a weighted average rating out of 100 to reviews from mainstream publications, this release received an average score of 80, based on 6 reviews.

Track listing

References

2020 albums
Pantha du Prince albums
Modern Records albums